Macrocoma latifrons is a species of leaf beetle endemic to the Canary Islands. It was first described by Harald Lindberg in 1953. It is found on Tenerife.

References

Beetles described in 1953
Endemic beetles of the Canary Islands
latifrons